Clyde is a town in Haywood County, North Carolina, United States. The 2010 census recorded the population at 1,223 people. It is part of the Asheville Metropolitan Statistical Area.

History
Prior to European colonization, the area that is now Clyde was inhabited by the Cherokee people and other Indigenous peoples for thousands of years. The Cherokee in Western North Carolina are known as the Eastern Band of Cherokee Indians, a federally recognized tribe.

The city of Clyde was founded in 1890.

On March 3, 1900, an African-American man named George Ratliffe was lynched in Clyde after being accused of raping an 8 year old white girl named Hester Wagstaff. The girl was the granddaughter of Ratliffe's employers, Matthias and Nithis Holland. Ratliffe was accused of committing the crime at 4:00 PM of March 3, 1900, three miles outside of Clyde. Arrested on the evening of the same day, and subjected to an initial trial in Clyde before being taken to the jail in Waynesville on March 4, a mob of 40-50 "masked men" attempted to break into the jail cell where Ratcliffe was held. Failing to break into the jail, the mob of white men fired 40 shots, killing Ratcliffe in his jail cell before he could go to trial or even speak with a lawyer. The Haywood County branch of the NAACP has supported the creation of a monument recognizing the murder of George Ratliffe.

The Shook-Welch-Smathers House was listed on the National Register of Historic Places in 2008.

Geography
Clyde is located at  (35.533021, -82.911686).

Demographics

2020 census

As of the 2020 United States census, there were 1,368 people, 509 households, and 351 families residing in the town.

2000 census
As of the census of 2000, there were 1,324 people, 547 households, and 373 families residing in the town. The population density was 1,579.2 people per square mile (608.6/km2). There were 607 housing units at an average density of 724.0 per square mile (279.0/km2). The racial makeup of the town was 94.94% White, 2.49% African American, 0.98% Native American, 0.83% from other races, and 0.76% from two or more races. Hispanic or Latino of any race were 1.89% of the population.

There were 547 households, out of which 29.3% had children under the age of 18 living with them, 51.6% were married couples living together, 12.8% had a female householder with no husband present, and 31.8% were non-families. 26.7% of all households were made up of individuals, and 10.2% had someone living alone who was 65 years of age or older. The average household size was 2.33 and the average family size was 2.82.

In the town, the population was spread out, with 22.6% under the age of 18, 9.3% from 18 to 24, 28.1% from 25 to 44, 22.1% from 45 to 64, and 18.0% who were 65 years of age or older. The median age was 38 years. For every 100 females, there were 85.4 males. For every 100 females age 18 and over, there were 82.1 males.

The median income for a household in the town was $33,000, and the median income for a family was $39,531. Males had a median income of $28,542 versus $21,034 for females. The per capita income for the town was $15,991. About 11.0% of families and 15.0% of the population were below the poverty line, including 22.1% of those under age 18 and 12.1% of those age 65 or over.

Education
Haywood County's only institution of higher education is Haywood Community College, a two-year college located just outside the city limits of Clyde.

The town also has Haywood Early College High School which is located on Haywood Community College's campus. Elementary Schools are  Clyde Elementary and Junaluska Elementary.  Students attend middle school at Canton Middle School then move to Pisgah High School. Clyde is also home to Haywood county’s alternative school central Haywood high school.

Points of interest

 Haywood Community College Arboretum
 September 11th Memorial

References

External links
 Haywood Community College

Asheville metropolitan area
 
Towns in Haywood County, North Carolina